Jérémy Cornu (born August 7, 1991, in Lisieux) is a French former cyclist, who rode professionally for the  team between 2016 and 2018.

Major results

2015
 5th Overall Tour de Normandie
 6th Overall Le Triptyque des Monts et Châteaux
 9th Overall Tour de Gironde
 10th Overall Flèche du Sud
2017
 1st Stage 1 Rhône-Alpes Isère Tour
 10th Tour du Finistère
2018
 3rd Overall Circuit des Ardennes
1st Stage 3
 6th Tour du Finistère

References

External links

1991 births
Living people
French male cyclists